Irugalur is a panchayat village  in Salem District of Tamil Nadu state, India. Irugalur has a population of about 2291.

References

Villages in Erode district